The 1635 Capture of Tortuga (often misdated to 1634) was a successful military campaign against the Anglo-French plantation, pirate, and buccaneering settlement of Tortuga, then a dependency of the Providence Island colony. It resulted in heavy casualties for the settlement, the severance of Tortuga's link with Providence Island, and Tortuga's further shift towards piracy and buccaneering.

Prelude 

English, French, and Dutch buccaneers settled Tortuga (and the northern coast of Hispaniola) in the 1600s or the 1610s, living off feral game, dye-wood logging, and piracy. In 1630, they were joined by some 150 English tobacco farmers from St. Kitts, who were led to the southern coast of Tortuga (near that shore's only harbour) by Anthony Hilton. These new settlers quickly formalised their colony by association with Providence Island. On 21 July 1631, Providence established the dependency of Association (i.e. Tortuga), providing for its defence and labour needs, and vesting its government in Hilton and his associate, Christopher Wormeley. This latter assumed governorship in 1634, upon Hilton's death.

Among the indentured servants or engagés which Providence provided Tortuga were John Murphy and his cousin, Irish Catholics. Upon Wormeley's inauguration as governor, these and many others were required to take oaths of allegiance, whereupon Murphy and his cousin protested, leading to the latter's death and the former's defection to Cartagena (first) and Santo Domingo (later).

Upon reaching Santo Domingo in 1634, Murphy informed local authorities that

Hereupon, Alonso de Cereceda, acting governor, convened a council of war, which resolved to 'dislodge the enemy from the said Island and punish their audacity before their greater expansion and fortification [occurs,] and because of the great [commercial] interest in the brazilwood and tobacco that they harvest and trade[,] and because it is [too] close to the route of the frigates and ships which come and go from this Island [Hispaniola] to that of Cuba[,] Cartaxena[,] and other parts[, being so located so as] to steal from these vessels.'

Capture

Arrival 
Turrillo and 50 infantry-men set off from Santo Domingo on 4 January 1635, with four baxeles in tow, to meet Fuenmayor and his 150 lancers at their rendezvous, Port Bayaha. The officers coordinated their attack while watering here, and shortly thereafter sailed due northwest, coasting the northern shore of Hispaniola.

Capture 
On 21 January 1635, under cover of night, Fuenmayor lead his armadilla or fleet across the Tortuga Channel, towards the island's southern port. The pilot, however, ran the ships aground, causing a ruckus which alerted four merchantmen to their presence. A loud and confused skirmish followed, as sailors rushed to man the fort and sound the alarm, while Spaniards simultaneously prepared their attack, with most taking to the ships' cannons, while a small contingent slipped away in canoes towards the beach. The kerfuffle resulted in the campaign's first casualties, for both sides.

Startled awake by the fort's bugles, the settlement was likewise a scene of frenzied chaos as French and English residents collected their valuables to make a hurried escape. At the Governor's residence, Wormeley likewise set upon retreat, managing to scurry away before Fuenmayor arrived. At this point, Fuenmayor, Turrillo, and Frías, with a unit of 24 men, disembarked near the settlement, at once marching towards the Governor's house. An unidentified resident (presumed to be the 'Governor' by Fuenmayor) put up a fight, but was quickly despatched with two well-aimed spear-throws. The 'Governor' now slain, Fuenmayor set about methodically sacking and burning the settlement, killing all whom they encountered. Meanwhile, the armadilla eventually took the fort, and thereby the port, forcing the merchant vessels to retreat.

By daybreak (on 22 January 1635), most or some of the settlers had made their escape, reportedly aboard rickety canoes towards Hispaniola. Fuenmayor's men now ventured further into Tortuga, under instructions 'that all the fields and houses be put to fire.'

The campaign's last engagement came on 23 January 1635. Some 190 of the island's residents had resolved to oppose the Spanish, rather than flee. Consequently, they had determined to march towards Fuenmayor's camp on this day. The Spanish general, however, discovered their plot, and met the musket-armed settlers halfway into their march. The engagement was reportedly quick and bitter, with the Spaniards exacting a substantial toll, themselves suffering only minimal casualties.

Aftermath 

On 2728 January 1635, the Spanish ships finally entered the port. Fuenmayor spent the following three or four days combing Tortuga before departing, with the rest of his men (and prisoners) following not long thereafter. The 39 prisoners were condemned to hard labour, building fortifications in Santo Domingo.

On 10 April 1635, proprietors of the Providence Island colony deprived Wormeley of his office and banished him from the Tortuga, 'by reason of his cowardice and negligence in losing the island.' He is thought to have relocated to York County, Virginia, where he served in various public offices.

It has been suggested that settlers who hid were 'hunted down' during Fuenmayor's sweep of the island, though a 'handful managed to conceal themselves in out-of-the-way recesses until the Spaniards [...] sailed back to San Domingo.' In any case, as no garrison remained in Tortuga, the island is thought to have been resettled within a few months of Fuenmayor's departure, in mid- or late 1635.

Legacy 

The capture was deemed 'a complete success.' Men who distinguished themselves were honoured with mercedes, and Fuenmayor was promoted to the governorship of Venezuela. It has been further suggested that this success encouraged campaigns against Dutch-held Curaçao and English-held Providence Island.

Wormeley, on the other hand, is said to have 'displayed the utmost cowardice.' 

It has been suggested that Fuenmayor's campaign contributed to Tortuga's transition from a quasi-plantation, quasi-pirate settlement to 'a true pirate stronghold,' as the campaign resulted in the removal of Providence Island's plantation-oriented oversight, and the eventual desertion of tobacco farmers, leaving mainly pirates and buccaneers.

Notes

Citations

References  

 
 
 
 
 
 
 
 
 
 
 
 
 
 
 
 
 
 
 
 
 
 
 
 
 
 
 
 
 

1635 in New Spain
1630s in the Caribbean
17th century in Haiti
Conflicts in 1635
Tortuga
Tortuga
Tortuga
Tortuga
Tortuga
Piracy in the Caribbean
Tortuga (Haiti)